William Edgar Farrell (August 2, 1879 – death date unknown) was an American Negro league first baseman in the 1900s.

A native of Ashland, Virginia, Farrell played for the Philadelphia Giants in 1902. In his two recorded games, he posted four hits and two RBI in nine plate appearances.

References

External links
Baseball statistics and player information from Baseball-Reference Black Baseball Stats and Seamheads

1879 births
Year of death missing
Place of death missing
Philadelphia Giants players
Baseball first basemen
Baseball players from Virginia
People from Ashland, Virginia